Paul McHale (born 30 September 1981 in (Stirling) is a Scottish retired Association footballer and current football agent.

Career

McHale started his career with Rangers, but failed to play a senior game for them. He was loaned out to St Mirren in 2003.

He joined Sauchie Juniors in December 2003, With the club, the team reached the last eight of the Scottish Junior Cup, finished runners up in the Lothian First Division and won the Lothians & Fife Cup (4–0 v Linlithgow Rose). He scored five times (out of 5) from the penalty spot for the team. McHale spent the 2004–05 season at Cowdenbeath.

He became Graham Roberts' first signing for Clyde in the summer of 2005. Paul was handed the captain's armband, and has proved to be an influential leader. McHale missed most of season 2005–06 with a stomach injury, including the shock Scottish Cup victory over Celtic. McHale hoped to lift Clyde's first major trophy in 48 years in November 2006, the Scottish Challenge Cup, but Clyde lost out on a penalty shoot out. 

In January 2006, he joined Dundee for a fee of £5,000. He was made redundant by the club in October 2010 when they entered administration. He then joined Stirling Albion until 3 January 2011, and then signed a contract extension in January which took him through to the end of the season.

Honours 
Sauchie Juniors
Fife and Lothians Cup: 2003–04

See also
2005–06 Clyde F.C. season | 2006–07

References

External links

1981 births
Living people
Footballers from Stirling
Scottish footballers
Association football midfielders
Scottish Football League players
Rangers F.C. players
St Mirren F.C. players
Cowdenbeath F.C. players
Clyde F.C. players
Dundee F.C. players
Stirling Albion F.C. players
Stenhousemuir F.C. players